is the 21st single by the Japanese girl idol group Berryz Kobo. It was released in Japan on November 11, 2009, and debuted at number 5 in the weekly Oricon singles chart.

The song "Ryūsei Boy" was used as the 3rd ending theme for the anime series Inazuma Eleven.

Track listings

CD single 

 
 "Watashi no Mirai no Danna-sama" (Instrumental)
 "Ryūsei Boy (Instrumental)
  
 Limited Edition A DVD
 "Watashi no Mirai no Danna-sama" (Close-up Ver.)

 Limited Edition B DVD
 "Ryūsei Boy" (Dance Shot Ver.)

DVD single "Ryūsei Boy" Single V 
 "Ryūsei Boy"
 "Ryūsei Boy" (Close-up Ver.)

Charts

References

External links 
 Profile on the Up-Front Works official website

2009 singles
2009 songs
Japanese-language songs
Berryz Kobo songs
Songs written by Tsunku
Piccolo Town singles